Sumitra Valmiki (born 1 January 1955) is an Indian politician and a member of the Rajya Sabha, upper house of the Parliament of India from Madhya Pradesh. She is a vice president of the Bharatiya Janata Party, Madhya Pradesh unit.

Career

She became a member of the Bharatiya Janata Party of Madhya Pradesh unit in 1993. In 1999, she was first time elected as councillor from Jabalpur, Madhya Pradesh. In 2004, she was again re-elected for the second time as councillor from Jabalpur, Madhya Pradesh.

In 2006, Sumitra Valmiki become the City president of Mahila Morcha from Jabalpur, Madhya Pradesh. In same year, she was also elected as Deputy Chairman of the Municipal Corporation of Jabalpur, Madhya Pradesh. In 2014, she was again re-elected as councillor by winning from Jabalpur, Madhya Pradesh and she was elected as Chairman of the Municipal Corporation of Jabalpur, Madhya Pradesh.

Early life

Sumitra Valmiki was born in the Shahpura, Patan-Tehsil Jabalpur District, Madhya Pradesh to a Dalit caste family. He finished his schooling from Govt. School of Shahpura, Patan-Tehsil Jabalpur District, Madhya Pradesh and went on to obtain a Bachelor of Arts degree from the Government College, Jabalpur District. After completing his Graduation, She continuously teaching Tailoring class for empowerment of women in their area and become popular for their class. She also has knowledge of Law and continuously fight for women welfare of their area. Her Social dedication to sort-out the issues for women welfare and other issues related to their area make them popular.

References

Bharatiya Janata Party politicians from Madhya Pradesh
Living people
Women members of the Rajya Sabha
Rajya Sabha members from Madhya Pradesh
Rajya Sabha members from the Bharatiya Janata Party
1955 births